Julius Ceasar Nina is an Anglican bishop in Uganda: he has been the  Bishop of West Lango since 2019.

References

Anglican bishops of West Lango
Uganda Christian University alumni
21st-century Anglican bishops in Uganda
Living people
Year of birth missing (living people)